Rohatyn Raion was a raion (district) of Ivano-Frankivsk Oblast (region). The town of Rohatyn was the administrative center of the raion. The raion was abolished on 18 July 2020 as part of the administrative reform of Ukraine, which reduced the number of raions of Ivano-Frankivsk Oblast Oblast to six. The area of Rohatyn Raion was merged into Ivano-Frankivsk Raion.

Subdivisions
At the time of disestablishment, the raion consisted of two hromadas:
 Bukachivtsi settlement hromada with the administration in the urban-type settlement of Bukachivtsi;
 Rohatyn urban hromada with the administration in Rohatyn.

Some of the villages in Rohatyn Raion were:

 Pukiv
 Lopushnia
 Verkhnia Lypytsia
 Korchunok
 Chesnyky
 Cherche
 Stratyn
 Klishchivna
 Pomoniata

References

Former raions of Ivano-Frankivsk Oblast
1940 establishments in Ukraine
Ukrainian raions abolished during the 2020 administrative reform